The  (named  between 2007 and 2017) is a limited express train service operated by Hokkaido Railway Company (JR Hokkaido) since 2007 on the Hakodate Main Line, connecting  and  in Hokkaido, Japan.

Service pattern

Services stop at the following stations.

Rolling stock

Services are formed of five-car 789-1000 series EMUs. All seats are non-reserved, except for car 4, which has upgraded "u-Seat" accommodation, including AC outlets for personal use.

Formations
The Kamui is operated by 5-car 789 series EMUs, formed as shown below, with car 1 at the Asahikawa end. There are no "Green cars" in all departures, and all cars are no-smoking.

History

Kamui (1959–1988)

The original Kamui service started on 22 September 1959, as a "semi express" service operating between Otaru and Asahikawa. From 1961, KiHa 56 express diesel multiple unit trains were introduced, and Kamui services were formally upgraded to "express" status from the start of the revised timetable on 5 March 1966. Following electrification of the route, 711 series three-car EMUs were introduced on the Kamui 3 and 4 services from October 1968. From 1 October 1969, these were increased to six-car formations.

Typical 711 series EMU Kamui express formations were formed as shown below as of 1 October 1969, with car 1 at the Asahikawa end.

From 15 March 1972, the number of Kamui services was increased from seven return workings to ten return workings daily.

Kamui services were discontinued from 13 March 1988, when they were integrated with Sorachi express services.

Super Kamui (2007–2017)

The Super Kamui service commenced on 1 October 2007. Prior to this, two limited express trains, the Lilac and the Super White Arrow, ran on the same route between Sapporo and Asahikawa. These were integrated and remodeled into one service at the same time as the ageing 781 series EMUs previously used on Lilac services were withdrawn.

Kamui (2017–present) 
From the start of the revised timetable on 4 March 2017, Super Kamui services were renamed simply Kamui, and are complemented by newly-introduced Lilac limited express services on the same route, which use six-car 789-0 series EMUs.

Accidents
The five-car 789-1000 series set involved, HL-1005, was taken out of service due to damage, and was officially withdrawn on 24 March 2011.

References

External links

 JR Hokkaido 789 series Kamui 

Hokkaido Railway Company
Named passenger trains of Japan
Railway services introduced in 1959
Railway services introduced in 2007